Clube Desportivo Portosantense, simply Portosantense, is a Portuguese football based in Porto Santo, Madeira. Founded in 1948, it currently plays in the Terceira Divisão, holding home matches at the José Lino Pestana (a club president), with a 2,500-seat capacity.

In 2004, Portosantense first reached the third division, remaining there four years. In the 2007–08 season, the club finished 10th and missed out on the 6th place required to guarantee promotion through the play-offs; it was later relegated back to the fourth level due to irregularities.

Former players

  Wesley John - Saint Vincent and the Grenadines international who played in Portugal for 23 years, including for clubs Ribeira Brava and Porto da Cruz, both below the Portuguese fourth tier)

External links
Official website 
Team profile at Zerozero

Football clubs in Portugal
Association football clubs established in 1948
1948 establishments in Portugal